Golding-Bird may refer to:

 Golding Bird (1814–1854), British medical doctor
 Cuthbert Hilton Golding-Bird (1848–1939), British surgeon and son of Golding Bird
 Cyril Golding-Bird (1876–1955), Anglican bishop